Trump Islands is a small group of islands lying 4 nautical miles (7 km) southwest of Dodman Island, off the west coast of Graham Land. The islands were discovered and named by the British Graham Land Expedition (BGLE), 1934–37, under Rymill.

See also 
 List of Antarctic and sub-Antarctic islands

Islands of Graham Land
Graham Coast